Llanfair Kilgeddin is a small village in Monmouthshire, south east Wales, lying within the administrative community of Llanover. It is located four miles north west of Usk and six miles south east of Abergavenny on the B4598 road. The River Usk passes close by.

History and notable buildings
A Norman motte and bailey castle site remains near the village.

St Mary's

Pant-y-Goitre House
Pant-y-Goitre is a country house thought to date to around 1776. It stands to the north of the village. The villa is a Grade II listed building, and the gardens and park were listed on the Cadw/ICOMOS Register of Parks and Gardens of Special Historic Interest in Wales.

Brynderwen
Brynderwen is a country house dating from the Victorian period. It stands to the west of the village, across the River Usk. The house is unlisted, but its gardens and park are included at Grade II on the Cadw/ICOMOS Register of Parks and Gardens of Special Historic Interest in Wales.

Gallery

References

Sources

External links
 Llanfair Kilgeddin church
   Llanfair Kilgeddin Primary School

Villages in Monmouthshire
Registered historic parks and gardens in Monmouthshire
Grade II listed buildings in Monmouthshire